Central Sport Club, usually known simply as Central, is a Brazilian football club. Based in Caruaru, Pernambuco state, the club competes in the Série D.

History
On June 15, 1919, at Sociedade Musical Comercial Caruaruense, the club was founded by Francisco Porto de Oliveira and the club name was a suggestion by Severino Bezerra.

In 1986, Central competed in the Campeonato Brasileiro Série B, which was named Taça de Prata and Torneio Paralelo. The club won its group and was promoted to the same year's first level. However, the club finished in the last position of its Série A group, and was relegated to the following year's second level.

Current squad

Achievements
Campeonato Pernambucano Second Level: 2
1999, 2022

Copa Pernambuco: 1
2001

Campeonato Pernambucano: 0
Runners-up (2): 2007, 2018

Rival
Central's greatest rival is from the same city: Clube Atlético do Porto. The game between the two is called "Clássico Matuto".

Mascot
Central's mascot is the Patativa, the local name for the Plumbeous Seedeater; a bird that habitates the hilly and fertile region of the Agreste.

References

External links

 Central Sport Club official website
 Torcida Central Net

 
Football clubs in Pernambuco
Association football clubs established in 1919
1919 establishments in Brazil